The 2018 Braidy Industries Women's Tennis Classic was a professional tennis tournament played on outdoor hard courts. It was the sixth edition of the tournament and was part of the 2018 ITF Women's Circuit. It took place in Ashland, United States, on 23–29 July 2018. It was the first edition of the tournament since 2008.

Singles main draw entrants

Seeds 

 1 Rankings as of 16 July 2018.

Other entrants 
The following player received a wildcard into the singles main draw:
  Hayley Carter

The following player received entry by a junior exempt:
  Whitney Osuigwe

The following players received entry from the qualifying draw:
  Gail Brodsky
  Catherine Harrison
  Maegan Manasse
  Anastasia Nefedova

The following player received entry as a lucky loser:
  Amanda Rodgers

Champions

Singles

 Gail Brodsky def.  Maegan Manasse, 4–6, 6–1, 6–0

Doubles

 Jovana Jakšić /  Renata Zarazúa def.  Sanaz Marand /  Whitney Osuigwe, 6–3, 5–7, [10–4]

External links 
 2018 Braidy Industries Women's Tennis Classic at ITFtennis.com
 Official website

2018 ITF Women's Circuit
2018 in American tennis
Tennis tournaments in the United States
Tennis in Kentucky